No One Knows About Persian Cats is a 2009 Iranian film directed by Bahman Ghobadi produced by Wild Bunch. The film offers the perspective of Iran as it explores its underground rock scene. It won the Special Jury Prize Ex-aequo in the Un Certain Regard section at the 2009 Cannes Film Festival.

Plot
The film follows two young musicians (Ashkan and Negar) as they form a band and prepare to leave Iran shortly after being released from prison. The pair befriends a man named Nader (Hamed Behdad), an underground music enthusiast and producer who helps them travel around Tehran and its surrounding areas in order to meet other underground musicians possibly interested in forming a band and later leaving the country.

Cast
 Hamed Behdad
 Ashkan Kooshanejad
 Negar Shaghaghi

Bands and musicians
 Take It Easy Hospital
 Rana Farhan
 Hichkas
 Meysam Eddie
 The Yellow Dogs
 Shervin Najafian
 Ash Koosha
 Mirza (band)
 The Free Keys
 Mahdyar Aghajani
 Darkoob
 Hamed Seyed Javadi
 Nik Aein Band

International cinema release dates
 23 December 2009: France
 3 February 2010: Belgium
 26 March 2010: U.K.
Limited release: Curzon Soho and key cities
 16 April 2010: U.S. (New York City only)
 16 April 2010: Italy
 15 July 2010: Israel

Reception

Accolades
Its first official screening was at the 2009 Cannes Film Festival where it won the Special Jury Prize Ex-aequo in the Un Certain Regard section.
  Cannes Film Festival:
 Special Jury Prize Ex-aequo in the Un Certain Regard section
 François Chalais Prize award

Accusations
Shortly after the release of the movie, Iranian director Torang Abedian accused Ghobadi of having used many ideas for his movie from her documentary Not an Illusion, made from 2003 to 2008 and released in the same year. According to Abedian, her camera operator got a call from Ghobadi and left her afterwards to make the movie about the same topic with Ghobadi in a few days.

References

External links
 Underground Musicians Fight The Man In Tehran, NPR movie review by Mark Jenkins, 2010-04-15, accessed 2010-05-07.
 
 In-depth review of the film and its soundtrack
 Behind the scene of No One Knows About Persian Cats 
 No One Knows About Persian Cats Soundtrack
 This is music from a brave and extraordinary musical movement, BBC review

2009 drama films
2009 films
Films directed by Bahman Ghobadi
Iranian drama films
2000s Persian-language films
Rock music films